Nikolai Ilkov (born 21 February 1955) is a Bulgarian sprint canoeist who competed in the late 1970s and early 1980s. He won a bronze medal in the C-2 500 m event at the 1980 Summer Olympics in Moscow.

References
Sports-reference.com profile

1955 births
Bulgarian male canoeists
Canoeists at the 1980 Summer Olympics
Living people
Olympic canoeists of Bulgaria
Olympic bronze medalists for Bulgaria
Olympic medalists in canoeing

Medalists at the 1980 Summer Olympics